Richard Justice may refer to:

Richard Justice (MP) (died 1548/9), MP for Reading
Richard Justice (composer) (died 1757), English harpsichordist and composer
Richard Justice (sports journalist), American sports journalist

See also
Dick Justice (1906–1962), American folk singer